Famous buildings in Novi Sad:

Historical buildings
Petrovaradin fortress 
Clock Tower

Cultural buildings
Serbian National Theatre 
Worker's University 
Eđšeg

Administrative buildings
City Hall 
White Banovina

Religious buildings

Bishop's Palace
Evangelical Lutheran Church of the Augsburg Confession in Kisač
Novi Sad Synagogue
The Name of Mary Church
Saint George's Cathedral

Sports buildings
Karađorđe Stadium
Spens Sports Center

Business buildings
NIS building
Main Post Office Building 
Novi Sad Fair

Other buildings
Train Station

See also
Religious architecture in Novi Sad
Infrastructure of Novi Sad

Gallery

 
Novi Sad